Phlorofucofuroeckol A is a phlorotannin isolated from brown algae species such as Eisenia bicyclis (an edible seaweed called arame in Japan), Ecklonia cava, Ecklonia kurome or Ecklonia stolonifera.

The molecule possesses both the dibenzo-1,4-dioxin and dibenzofuran elements.

References 

Benzofuran ethers at the benzene ring
Dibenzofurans
Phlorotannins